Savolax and Karelia County was a county of Sweden 1775-1809 and province of Grand Duchy of Finland 1809-1831. It was formed in 1775 when Savolax and Kymmenegård County was divided into Savolax and Karelia County and Kymmenegård County. Residence city was Kuopio. 

By the Treaty of Fredrikshamn in 1809 Sweden ceded all its territories in Finland, east of the Torne River, to Russia. Savolax and Karelia Province was succeeded in 1831 by the Kuopio Province in the autonomic Grand Duchy of Finland. Minor parts of province were merged to Mikkeli Province.

Maps

Governors 

Otto Ernst Boije 1775–1781
Georg Henrik von Wright 1781–1786
Simon Vilhelm Carpelan 1786–1791
Anders Johan Ramsay 1791–1803
Eric Johan von Fieandt 1803
Olof Wibelius 1803–1809
Simon Vilhelm Carpelan 1809–1810
Gustaf Aminoff 1810–1827
Carl Klick 1828–1829
Lars Sacklen 1829–1831

Former counties of Sweden
Former provinces of Finland
States and territories established in 1775